Joshua Tyler Staumont (born December 21, 1993) is an American professional baseball pitcher for the Kansas City Royals of Major League Baseball (MLB).

Amateur career
Staumont attended La Habra High School in La Habra, California and played college baseball at Biola University and Azusa Pacific University. In 2014, he played collegiate summer baseball in the Cape Cod Baseball League, winning a league title with the Yarmouth-Dennis Red Sox. He was drafted by the Kansas City Royals in the second round of the 2015 Major League Baseball draft and became one of the highest selected players from Azusa Pacific.

Professional career

Minor leagues
Staumont made his professional debut in 2015 with the Arizona League Royals and was later promoted to the Idaho Falls Chukars; in 18 combined games between both teams, he went 3-1 with a 2.48 ERA. In 2016, Staumont pitched for both the Wilmington Blue Rocks and Northwest Arkansas Naturals, pitching to a combined 4-11 record and 4.23 ERA in 29 total games (26 total starts) between both teams. After the season, he played in the Arizona Fall League.

Staumont spent 2017 with both Northwest Arkansas and the Omaha Storm Chasers where he went 6-12 with a 5.56 ERA with 138 strikeouts in 124.2 total innings pitched between the two clubs. In 2018, he pitched for Omaha, going 2-5 with a 3.51 ERA in 74.1 innings pitched, mainly in relief. The Royals added Staumont to their 40-man roster after the 2018 season. He returned to Omaha to begin 2019.

Kansas City Royals
On July 20, 2019, the Royals promoted Staumont to the major leagues. He made his major league debut on July 25, pitching two scoreless innings in relief.

In 2020, he was 2–1 with a 2.45 ERA. Balls hit off of him had the highest average exit velocity of those hit off of any major league pitcher, at 94.4 mph.

In 2021, Staumont was 4–3 with a 2.88 ERA and 72 strikeouts in  innings.

Personal life
Staumont and his wife, Angelina, married in January 2019.

References

External links

1993 births
Living people
People from La Habra, California
Baseball players from California
Major League Baseball pitchers
Kansas City Royals players
Biola Eagles baseball players
Azusa Pacific Cougars baseball players
Arizona League Royals players
Idaho Falls Chukars players
Wilmington Blue Rocks players
Northwest Arkansas Naturals players
Omaha Storm Chasers players
Surprise Saguaros players
Yarmouth–Dennis Red Sox players